Sutton Lake is a  reservoir on the Elk River in Braxton and Webster counties, West Virginia. Sutton Lake is located just upstream of Sutton. It was authorized by Congress in the Flood Control Act of 1938. Construction of the dam began in 1956 and was completed in 1961. The lake was named by Congressional action, Public Law 90-46, July 4, 1967.

General information

It is a beautiful lake, winding 14 miles along the Elk River, with many coves along its 40 miles of shoreline. The lake is 125 feet deep at the dam. Sutton Dam is located just above the Town of Sutton, 101 miles above the mouth of the Elk River in Charleston. It is a concrete-gravity structure 210 feet high, 1,178 feet long, and 195 feet wide at the base. It controls a 537 square mile drainage area, including the upper Elk River, and the Holly River. Sutton Dam was built primarily for flood control on the Elk, Kanawha and Ohio Rivers. During periods of flooding, water is stored behind the dam, frequently reducing the severity of flooding below the dam. It was completed in 1961 at a cost of $35 million. Flood damages have been reduced by more than $375 million by flood control efforts at Sutton Dam. The U.S. Army Corps of Engineers operates and maintains the dam and project recreation facilities. Restrooms are located at the Project Office and all recreation areas. For more information about Braxton County and area attractions, visit the Braxton County Visitor and Convention Bureau's web site.

Environment
Some reports of a 2013 Wake Forest University study of selenium contamination in Sutton Lake in North Carolina (allegedly due to coal ash from the Sutton power plant of Duke Energy), erroneously attributed this contamination to Sutton Lake in West Virginia.  Sutton Lake in North Carolina is on the Cape Fear River; whereas Sutton Lake in West Virginia is on the Elk River, an entirely different river drainage basin.

References

External links
U.S. Army Corps of Engineers website

Bodies of water of Braxton County, West Virginia
Bodies of water of Webster County, West Virginia
Reservoirs in West Virginia
Dams in West Virginia
United States Army Corps of Engineers, Huntington District
Elk River (West Virginia)